Planina pod Golico is a mountain village in the Municipality of Jesenice, in the Upper Carniola region of Slovenia.

Name
The settlement was officially known as Planina in the 19th century, but by the 20th century the name Sveti Križ nad Jesenicami (literally, 'Holy Cross above Jesenice') was also used. The name of the settlement was changed from Sveti Križ to Planina pod Golico (literally, 'pasture below Golica') in 1955. The name was changed on the basis of the 1948 Law on Names of Settlements and Designations of Squares, Streets, and Buildings as part of efforts by Slovenia's postwar communist government to remove religious elements from toponyms.

History

The settlement was originally linked to ironworks. In the 14th century smelting ovens operated in the Carniolan village, and the beginnings of mining are documented in an Ortenburg mining order dating to 1381 that mentions mining and blast furnace operations at Sveti Križ. A copy of this document is exhibited in the Museum of the History of Steel Production in Jesenice.

After the 15th century, the ironworks were moved further down into the valley, closer to a greater source of water needed for the process, and Jesenice became the main industrial and administrative centre. Iron ore was still mined close to the village in the Sava Caves area until the early 20th century.

Church
Exaltation of the Holy Cross Church is a parish church that was built in the late 17th century (1683) by the Bucelleni family, the Italian owners of mines in the surrounding area. The village nucleus developed around it; the settlement also derived its older name of Sveti Križ from the church.

Other heritage

Today the village is known as a starting point for hiking routes to nearby scenic peaks such as Golica and Rožca, and especially for the wild white narcissus that flower in mountain pastures around the village from late April to early May. The plants have been protected by law since 1949 and picking them is strictly forbidden. A narcissus festival is held by the local tourist association in May. The chairlift for the Španov vrh ski slope also begins in Planina pod Golico. There is also a natural luge track beyond the village in the Sava Caves area and competitions are held by the Jesenice Luge Club here every winter.

References

External links

Planina pod Golico on Geopedia
Golica tourist association site

Populated places in the Municipality of Jesenice